The Herald Sun Tour is an Australian professional bicycle race held in Melbourne and provincial Victoria, sanctioned by the Union Cycliste Internationale (UCI). The first tour was held in October 1952 as a six-day event. It is now held annually over five days in February.  It is named after the Herald Sun, Melbourne's only daily tabloid newspaper.  It was originally known as the Sun Tour after The Sun News-Pictorial, and changed its name when The Sun News-Pictorial merged with The Herald in 1990.

History

In 1952 the first general classification winner was Keith Rowley, a Maffra sheep farmer, in a time of 42 h 57 min 55 s. The first King of the Mountain and Sprint champion was Jack (John) McDonough from Coburg.

Australian cyclists dominated the first 30 editions of the race, before its status rose and began attracting overseas stars. By the year 2000, the race had shifted to October and Australia's cyclists racing in Europe began to compete in the race. The resulting rise in the event's standard saw the race become rated by the UCI for the first time in 2005.
Several notable Australian cyclists have won the General classification including Stuart O'Grady in 2008, Baden Cooke in 2002, Neil Stephens in 1986, and Russell Mockridge in 1957.

The 2004 race was conducted from 14 to 24 October 2004 and involved 85 cyclists in seventeen teams of five. Thirteen stages were completed with a total distance of 1110.7 km, 119 intermediate sprints and 37 hill climbs, including the two category one climbs of Mount Baw Baw and in the Otway Ranges. Swedish rider Jonas Ljungblad won the General classification in the time of 26 h 39 min 55 s. Karl Menzies won the sprint classification and Phillip Thuaux won the Mountains classification.

After the 2009 race, the organisers of the Herald Sun Tour proposed moving the race from its traditional October date to February, with no edition in 2010. Cycling Australia approved the move, but in the face of opposition from the UCI, the plans never came to fruition. In the end, the 2010 race was "held over" due to the 2010 UCI Road World Championships being held in Geelong and Melbourne, and the race returned to the calendar in October 2011. The UCI accepted a change of date the following year, with a January 2013 date instead of October 2012, but downgraded the race from 2.1 to a National Event, preventing most professional teams from across the world from taking part.

2014
The next edition of the Tour was held from 5–9 February 2014, and regained a UCI 2.1 ranking, permitting top level trade teams to again compete. Due to numerous bushfires across Victoria the last stage of the race was cancelled, with  rider Simon Clarke declared the winner.

2016
The 63rd edition of the Tour got a huge profile boost when reigning Tour de France champion Chris Froome of  confirmed he would be starting his 2016 season at the event, having previously participated in 2008 with the Barloworld team where he finished 4th overall.  Froome won the overall title on the final stage on Arthurs Seat, making him the first defending Tour de France champion to win the race, with teammate Peter Kennaugh finishing second and Damien Howson of Orica-GreenEdge placing third.  He also took the mountains classification.

2017

2018
The 65th edition of the Herald Sun Tour was won by Esteban Chaves of the World Tour ranked  team. Michelton Scott dominated the general classification of the 2018 edition with teammates Cameron Meyer (2nd) and previous winner Damien Howson (3rd) rounding out the final podium.

2019

2021 
In August 2020, the 2021 edition was cancelled due to the uncertainty and unpredictability caused by the impact of COVID-19. The event will be rescheduled to February 2022.

Winners

References

Herald Sun Tour 2004 Cycling results

External links

 
Cycle races in Australia
Cycling in Melbourne
Recurring sporting events established in 1952
1952 establishments in Australia
UCI Oceania Tour races
Newspaper events
Cycling events in Victoria